Juli Crocombe is a consultant psychiatrist and specialist in autism. She has been appointed director of clinical services and research for the charity Caudwell Children. She was formerly clinical director for autistic spectrum disorders at St Andrew's Healthcare and before that a consultant psychiatrist for South Staffordshire and Shropshire Healthcare NHS Foundation Trust. She is chairperson of the All Party Parliamentary Group on Autism.

References

External links 
https://www.atautism.org/dr-juli-crocombe-can-psychotropic-medication-ever-least-restrictive-intervention-behaviour-challenges/
https://www.youtube.com/watch?v=wwy5sMG4nsQ

Autism researchers
British psychiatrists
Living people
Year of birth missing (living people)